1160 Illyria, provisional designation , is a stony Maria asteroid from the central regions of the asteroid belt, approximately 13 kilometers in diameter. It was discovered on 9 September 1929, by German astronomer Karl Reinmuth at the Heidelberg Observatory in southwest Germany. The asteroid was named after the ancient region of Illyria, located on the Balkan Peninsula.

Orbit and classification 

Based on the Hierarchical Clustering Method, which uses a body's proper orbital elements, Illyria is a member of the Maria family, a large intermediate belt family of stony asteroids. It has also been grouped into the Eunomia family, an even larger family with more than 5,000 known members.

Illyria orbits the Sun in the central asteroid belt at a distance of 2.3–2.9 AU once every 4 years and 1 month (1,497 days; semi-major axis of 2.56 AU). Its orbit has an eccentricity of 0.12 and an inclination of 15° with respect to the ecliptic. The body's observation arc begins with a recovery observation at Lowell Observatory in October 1929, three weeks after its official discovery observation at Heidelberg.

Physical characteristics 

Illyria is an assumed stony S-type asteroid, which agrees with the overall spectral type of both the Maria and Eunomia family.

Rotation period 

Several rotational lightcurves of Illyria have been obtained from photometric observations since 2007. Lightcurve analysis gave a consolidated rotation period of 4.1025 hours with a brightness amplitude between 0.56 and 0.91 magnitude.

Spin axis 

In 2013, an international study also modeled the asteroid's lightcurve from photometric data. It gave a concurring period of 4.10295 hours and determined a partial spin axis of (n.a., 47.0°) in ecliptic coordinates (λ, β).

Diameter and albedo 

According to the surveys carried out by the Japanese Akari satellite and the NEOWISE mission of NASA's Wide-field Infrared Survey Explorer, Illyria measures between 12.73 and 14.767 kilometers in diameter and its surface has an albedo between 0.2242 and 0.349.

The Collaborative Asteroid Lightcurve Link assumes an albedo of 0.21, derived from the parent body of the Eunomia family, and calculates a diameter of 13.88 kilometers based on an absolute magnitude of 11.6.

Naming 

This minor planet was named after Illyria, an ancient region on the Balkans which borders the Adriatic Sea. The official naming citation was mentioned in The Names of the Minor Planets by Paul Herget in 1955.

References

External links 
 Asteroid Lightcurve Database (LCDB), query form (info )
 Dictionary of Minor Planet Names, Google books
 Asteroids and comets rotation curves, CdR – Observatoire de Genève, Raoul Behrend
 Discovery Circumstances: Numbered Minor Planets (1)-(5000) – Minor Planet Center
 
 

001160
Discoveries by Karl Wilhelm Reinmuth
Named minor planets
19290909